Novopreobrazhensky is a rural locality (a khutor) in Zilairsky Selsoviet, Zilairsky District, Bashkortostan, Russia. The population was 23 as of 2010. There are 3 streets.

Geography 
Novopreobrazhensky is located 16 km southeast of Zilair (the district's administrative centre) by road. Salyakhovo is the nearest rural locality.

References 

Rural localities in Zilairsky District